Novi Punk Val (meaning New Punk Wave) is a compilation album of punk rock and new wave music from the SFR Yugoslavia. It covers the period from 1978 till 1980. It was released by ZKP RTLJ in 1981. It includes songs by notable Slovenian and Croatian artists from the former Yugoslav punk rock and new wave scenes including: Pankrti, Paraf, Prljavo kazalište, Termiti and others. 

Along with Paket aranžman and Artistička radna akcija compilations which featured artists from Belgrade, Serbia it is considered a symbol of the former Yugoslav punk and new wave era.

Track listing

 "Anarhist" - Pankrti
 "Tovar'ši, jest vam ne verjamem" - Pankrti
 "Lublana je bulana" - Pankrti
 "Moj otac je bio u ratu" - Prljavo kazalište
 "Narodna pjesma" - Paraf
 "Sranje" - Problemi
 "Grad izobilja" - Problemi
 "Možgani na asfaltu" - Berlinski zid
 "Po cestah mesta" - Berlinski zid
 "Videti jih" - 92
 "Kontroliram misli" - 92
 "To ni balet" - Buldogi
 "Vjeran pas" - Termiti
 "Mama, s razlogom se brineš" - Termiti
 "Vremenska progonoza" - Termiti

See also
Paket aranžman
Artistička radna akcija
Svi marš na ples!
Vrući dani i vrele noći
Punk rock in Yugoslavia
New wave music in Yugoslavia

Punk rock albums by Croatian artists
Punk rock albums by Slovenian artists
Punk rock compilation albums
New wave compilation albums
1980 compilation albums
Regional music compilation albums
ZKP RTLJ compilation albums
Punk rock albums by Yugoslav artists
Croatian-language compilation albums
Slovene-language compilation albums
Serbian-language compilation albums
New wave albums by Croatian artists
New wave albums by Serbian artists
New wave albums by Yugoslav artists